Olde Towne Brewing Company was a brewery located in Huntsville, Alabama, United States. Founded in 2004, the Olde Towne Brewing Company was the first microbrewery in Huntsville since the repeal of Prohibition.

The brewery debuted August 12, 2004, at Humphrey's Bar & Grill, a local establishment. In the early hours of July 5, 2007, the building that housed the company, a part of the former Fowler's Department Store, suffered a fire and was a complete loss.  In summer 2008 the brewery finished rebuilding and their beer was again available for sale in Huntsville in August.  Distribution was limited to north and central Alabama.  Olde Towne stopped bottling beer December 2010, stopped brewing February 2011, and ceased operations.

Don Alan Hankins was the original brewmaster and co-owner of the company.  Daniel Stearns was the last brewmaster.

Beers
As of late July 2008, all four regular Olde Towne beers were fermenting Amber, Pale Ale, Hefeweizen, and Pilsner, and were kegged in preparation for sale on draught first.  Bottling resumed later in 2008.  They also brought back their seasonal brews, including a Porter, a Pumpkin Ale and a Bock.  Olde Towne started contract brewing with the introduction of their Chocolate Stout, which was commissioned by The Nook, a local craft brew lounge, in Huntsville.  Before the fire, Olde Towne had stopped production of the Extra Pale Ale and it did not return.

References 

Beer brewing companies based in Alabama
Companies based in Huntsville, Alabama
2004 establishments in Alabama
2011 disestablishments in Alabama
American companies established in 2004